The Nedbank Golf Challenge, previously known as the Million Dollar Challenge, is an annual men's professional golf tournament played at the Gary Player Country Club in Sun City, North West province, South Africa. It was first played in 1981 and takes place towards the end of the year, in November or December.

For many years the tournament was a small-field invitational stroke play event with typically 12 players competing. Since it became a European Tour event in 2013, the field size has increased, to 30 from 2013 to 2015 and to 72 in 2016. Originally it was not an official event for any of the major tours.

From 2010 to 2012, a separate tournament for senior golfers was held concurrently.

History
The first tournament was played from 31 December 1981 to 4 January 1982 with a field of 5: Seve Ballesteros, Johnny Miller, Jack Nicklaus, Gary Player and Lee Trevino. Ballesteros and Miller tied on 277 with Nicklaus a stroke behind after he missed a putt at the final hole. Miller beat Ballesteros at the ninth hole of a sudden-death playoff. The pair played the 16th to 18th holes three times before Ballesteros three-putted. Miller won $500,000 out of total prize money of $1,000,000.

The date was moved to early December 1982 for the second tournament, with 10 players competing. Total prize money remained at $1,000,000 with $300,000 for the winner and $50,000 for the 10th player. There was another playoff, with Raymond Floyd beating Craig Stadler at the fourth extra hole. The format remained unchanged from 1983 to 1986 with the event played in early December each year.

The 1987 event introduced a winner-take-all $1,000,000 first prize, although there were additional prizes for the lowest round each day. The field was reduced to 8 player. Ian Woosnam won by 4 strokes and took the first million dollar prize in golf. The winner-take-all idea was dropped for 1988, although the first prize remained as $1,000,000. The format remained largely unchanged through 1999, with the first prize always $1,000,000, although the field increased from 8 to 10 in 1989 and to 12 from 1993. There were two playoffs during this period. In 1996 Colin Montgomerie beat Ernie Els with a birdie at the third extra hole, while in 1998 Nick Price beat Tiger Woods with a birdie at the fifth extra hole.

In 2006, the tournament carried World Rankings points for the first time since 1999. In 2013 it was expanded to 30 players: the defending tournament champion; the top 10 PGA Tour FedEx Cup players, the top 10 European Tour Race to Dubai players; the Sunshine Tour, Asian Tour, Japan Golf Tour and PGA Tour of Australasia Order of Merit winners; the Alfred Dunhill Championship winner; and the top 5 South African players in the World Rankings.

From 2000 to 2002 the first prize was increased to US$2 million, but the following year the winner's share of the total prize fund was reduced from more than half to around 30%. The standard winner's share on the PGA Tour is 18% and on the European Tour it is 16.67%. In 2006 the winner received $1.2 million out of a total purse of US$4.385 million, so the prize distribution is now not far from the normal pattern for a professional tournament, once allowance is made for the small size of the field. That US$2 million first prize remained the largest in professional golf, but was matched in 2011 by the Lake Malaren Shanghai Masters.

The 2016 event was part of the European Tour Final Series, replacing the BMW Masters, while in 2017 the event was part of the new Rolex Series. Since 2016, the field of 72 consists of the top 64 available players from the current year Race to Dubai standings, the defending champion, the winner of the Sunshine Tour order of merit from previous year, and tournament invitations.

Winners

Notes

References

External links
Official site
Coverage on the European Tour's official site

European Tour events
Sunshine Tour events
Golf tournaments in South Africa
Sport in North West (South African province)
Moses Kotane Local Municipality
Recurring sporting events established in 1981
1981 establishments in South Africa